The New York Knights are a semi-professional rugby league football team based in New York City. The team currently plays in the USA Rugby League. They play their home games at Pier 40 in Hudson River Park.

Originally known as the New York Broncos, the team was founded in 1997 and joined the league eventually known as the American National Rugby League (AMNRL) for its inaugural 1998 season. They adopted their current name in 2001 after forming a team partnership with the Newcastle Knights of Australia's National Rugby League, who sent them jerseys. The Knights competed in the AMNRL until it folded in 2014, and joined the USARL the following year. In the AMNRL they won season championships in 2002, 2009, 2011, and 2012.

History
The team was founded in 1997. Originally known as the New York Broncos, they joined Super League America, the predecessor to the modern American National Rugby League, for its inaugural 1998 season. In 2001 the Knights and other teams in the competition departed to form the AMNRL. All teams formed a partnership with teams in Australia's National Rugby League. New York formed a partnership with the Newcastle Knights, who sent them Knights jerseys; the team subsequently changed their name to the New York Knights.

The Knights advanced to the AMNRL Grand Final in 2002. A serious thunderstorm interrupted the game, and the Knights, who were leading perennial champions the Glen Mills Bulls 18-12, were declared winners. This was the first time any team besides the Bulls had taken the Grand Final. The Knights made several other playoff appearances, and defeated the Jacksonville Axemen to win the 2009 AMNRL Grand Final. The Knights have provided a total of nine players to the United States national rugby league team to date, as well as one to Japan.

The Knights remained in the AMNRL until it folded in 2014. The following year they joined the USA Rugby League, along with other surviving AMNRL clubs.

Uniform and colors
Since 2001 the Knights have based their uniforms and team colors on those of the Newcastle Knights of the NRL, due to their team partnership. Following Newcastle their colors are white, red and blue, and the uniforms are predominantly blue. For the 2006 and 2007 seasons the club's major jersey sponsor was Guinness.

Stadium
The Knights currently use the Pier 40, Hudson River Park Stadium in Hudson River Park as their home ground. The stadium is sometimes referred to as The Castle because of the architecture and surrounding river, give the park a Castle like appearance.

Current season
The Knights finished the 2016 conference season with a record of 7-1. They will play the winners of Boston 13s v Brooklyn Kings in the Playoffs

Current 2019 roster
Karim Singleton
Randy Porter
Curtis Cunz
Chad Sharp
Kyle DePew
Matt Sharp

Notable players
 Ryan Mulligan
 Olivier Pramil
 Olivier Janzac
Stephen Thompson
Kruse robinson
Troy Doyle

Honors
AMNRL Championship titles: 4
  2002, 2009, 2011, 2012
Mother's Day Sevens: 1
  2001
North East Division: 1
  2016

See also
 Rugby league in the United States
 List of defunct rugby league clubs in the United States

References

External links
Official websites
 New York Knights Website

News sites
 USARL Website

American National Rugby League teams
Sports teams in New York City
Rugby clubs established in 1997
USA Rugby League teams
Rugby league teams in New York (state)